Metso means Western capercaillie in Finnish. Notable people with the surname include:

Frida Johansson Metso (born 1984), Swedish politician 
Teemu Metso (born 1985), Finnish ice hockey player 

Finnish-language surnames